Paper kite butterfly may refer to:
 Idea leuconoe, a butterfly species found in Asia and Northern Australia
 Idea malabarica, a butterfly species found in peninsular India